Tournament for U-21 teams, played in San Salvador, 15–22 January 1994.

Teams

Squads

Group stage

Group A

Group B

Third place match

Final

References 

Football at the Central American Games
1994 Central American Games